Kevin Ellis (born 11 May 1977) is an English football defender.

References

Since 1888... The Searchable Premiership and Football League Player Database (subscription required)
Pride of Anglia

1977 births
Living people
English footballers
Association football defenders
Premier League players
Ipswich Town F.C. players
King's Lynn F.C. players
People from Tiptree